Michael Rian Torrence (April 15, 1961 – September 6, 1996) was an American serial killer responsible for the murders of three people in South Carolina from February to March 1987, two of which were committed with the help of his brother and his brothers wife, Donna. Sentenced to death for one murder and two life terms, Torrence successfully volunteered for his execution, dropping all appeals against the wishes of his public defender, and was executed in 1996.

Murders and arrest
In early 1987, 20-year-old Donna Michele Webb Torrence, a topless dancer who worked at a strip club called "The Carriage House" near Fort Jackson, complained to her husband, 28-year-old Thomas John Torrence, that two patrons had supposedly taunted her. In order to get back at them, Torrence recruited his younger brother, Michael, and the trio decided to rob them. They eventually tracked the two men, 31-year-old Charles Alan Bush and 41-year-old Dennis Lollis, both of whom were engineers at the M. Lowenstein Corporation textile mill in Olympia, to their shared room at the Red Roof Inn in Cayce.

On February 11, Donna, went to the hotel and knocked on the victims door and told Mr. Bush her car had broke down and persuaded him to give her a ride to her residence, who then drove her to her family house in Pine Ridge. She invited him to come inside, just as he entered the house Michael was hiding behind the door and slammed it shut behind the victim. Thomas and Michael then beat Mr. Bush with a tire thumper and choked him with a dog chain. The pair then stole the key to the motel room and drove to the Red Carpet Inn, where they snuck in and stabbed the sleeping Lollis to death. After stealing all of the money and valuables they could find, the brothers left. On the following day, Lollis' body was discovered, with an autopsy determining that he had been stabbed over 20 times.

Soon after the murders, the Torrences left Pine Ridge and resettled in Charleston. On March 28, Michael picked up a 20-year-old prostitute, Cynthia M. Williams, but for reasons unknown, the pair got into an argument. Angered, he grabbed a shotgun and shot her in the chest, killing Williams on the spot. He then drove to the I-526 and dumped her body, where it was soon discovered by two motorists. As he was last seen in her company, Michael was considered the prime suspect by police, who kept him under surveillance until they gathered enough evidence to secure an arrest. On April 6, the two brothers were arrested at their Charleston home and brought in for interrogation. During questioning, they both admitted responsibility for the Bush-Lollis murders, later indicating where they had buried Bush's body.

Trial, volunteering and execution
After their arrest, the Torrences were held without bond and in separate jails: Donna and Thomas were in Lexington County, while Michael was held in Charleston County. Due to the severity of their crimes, prosecutors in both counties considered seeking the death penalty against all three defendants, especially concerning the Bush-Lollis murders. By the end of the trial, however, only Michael would be sentenced to death on one count for Lollis' murder, receiving life terms for the two other murders. His brother also received a life term, while Donna accepted a plea deal and was given a lesser sentence in exchange for testifying against them.

The sentence was overturned by the South Carolina Supreme Court just a year later, and Torrence was ordered to undergo a new trial in 1994, where he was again found guilty and resentenced to death by jury verdict. Soon after, Torrence started petitioning the courts to allow him to drop all of his pending appeals, as he claimed that he preferred to be executed rather than spend the rest of his life in prison. Due to this, he frequently clashed with his court-appointed lawyer Joe Savitz, who barred him from doing interviews with the press. Savitz expressed his belief that his client was mentally unstable, as he had supposedly claimed to have killed a family in Guatemala in 1979 while working as a mercenary, which Torrence's father said could not be true, as Michael had been imprisoned in North Carolina at the time. In contrast, prosecutor Donald Myers supported Torrence's efforts, arguing that, in contrast to what his attorney claimed, his racial prejudices and other hateful beliefs did not make him irrational, and that he was well-aware of what he had done.

Nevertheless, Torrence continued to push for his appeals to be dropped, stating in multiple interviews that while he acknowledged the gravity of his actions, he did not feel any remorse for the victims. He was eventually granted his request, and was scheduled for execution on September 6, 1996. After the announcement, Dennis Lollis' widow, Shelby, announced in a media interview that she would attend his execution, as she considered it a debt she owed to her late husband. On the aforementioned date, Torrence was executed via lethal injection at the Broad River Correctional Institution in Columbia, amidst fears Hurricane Fran might strike the state. Before his execution, Torrence's lawyer read a handwritten statement in which he claimed that he now "acknowledges and understands the effects" of his crimes, that he wished this would bring closure to the victims' families and that he had accepted God as his savior. His request for a last meal (steak, shrimp and lobster prepared by a local Japanese restaurant) was rejected, and the prison cafeteria instead gave him shrimp with cocktail sauce and strawberry shortcake. Torrence was executed on the same day as Douglas Franklin Wright, another serial killer who was executed in Oregon.

See also
 Capital punishment in South Carolina
 List of people executed by lethal injection
 List of people executed in South Carolina
 List of serial killers in the United States
 Volunteer (capital punishment)

External links
 State v. Torrence (1991)

References

1961 births
1996 deaths
20th-century American criminals
20th-century executions by South Carolina
American male criminals
American prisoners sentenced to life imprisonment
Criminals from South Carolina
Executed American serial killers
Executed people from South Carolina
Male serial killers
People convicted of murder by South Carolina
People executed by South Carolina by lethal injection
People from Lexington County, South Carolina
Prisoners sentenced to life imprisonment by South Carolina